National Legislative Assembly is the term used in Thailand for certain unelected parliaments. It may refer to:
 National Legislative Assembly of Thailand (2006)
 National Legislative Assembly of Thailand (2014)

See also
National Assembly of Thailand